Events in the year 1972 in Spain.

Incumbents
Caudillo: Francisco Franco

Births
 Montse Ribé.
 27 March - Ignacio Garrido, golfer
 1 April - José María Valderas Martínez, Academic General Practitioner and health services researcher
 20 September - Ramon Tribulietx.

Deaths
23 March - Cristóbal Balenciaga.
20 April – Jorge Mistral, actor (b. 1920)

See also
 List of Spanish films of 1972

References

 
Years of the 20th century in Spain
1970s in Spain
Spain
Spain